Many fictional depictions of the Romani in literature and art present Romanticized narratives of their supposed mystical powers of fortune telling, and their supposed irascible or passionate temper which is paired with an indomitable love of freedom and a habit of criminality. Critics of how Romani people have been portrayed in popular culture point out similarities to portrayals of Jewish people, with both groups stereotyped negatively as wandering, spreading disease, abducting children, and violating and murdering others.

Romani people were portrayed in Victorian and modern British literature as having "sinister occult and criminal tendencies" and as associated with "thievery and cunning", and in English Renaissance and baroque theatre as incorporating "elements of outlandish charm and elements which depict [them] as the lowest of social outcasts," connected with "magic and charms," and "juggling and cozening." In opera, literature and music, throughout Europe, Romani women have been portrayed as provocative, sexually available, gaudy, exotic and mysterious. Hollywood and European movies, as well as popular music and other forms of pop culture, have promoted similar stereotypes.

Particularly notable representations of Romani people appear in classics like Carmen by Prosper Mérimée and adapted by Georges Bizet, Victor Hugo's  The Hunchback of Notre-Dame and Miguel de Cervantes'  La Gitanilla.
The Romani were also heavily romanticized in the Soviet Union, a classic example being the 1975 Tabor ukhodit v Nebo.
A more realistic depiction of contemporary Romani in the Balkans, featuring Romani lay actors speaking in their native dialects, although still playing with established clichés of a Romani penchant for both magic and crime, was presented by Emir Kusturica in his Time of the Gypsies (1988) and Black Cat, White Cat (1998). Another realistic depiction of Romanies in Yugoslavia is I Even Met Happy Gypsies (1967).

Literature 
1596: A Midsummer Night's Dream by William Shakespeare – Which includes the lines "Sees Helen's beauty in the brow of Egypt" ("Egyptian" was used to refer to the Romani people of England). Here, Theseus is imagining the face of a lover can make the dark-skinned Roma look like Helen of Troy, who he considers more beautiful.
1600: As You Like It a pastoral comedy by Shakespeare – He uses the word "ducdame" (Act II, Sc. 5), possibly a corruption or mishearing of the old Anglo-Romani word dukka me or (I foretell or I tell fortunes).
1603: Othello by Shakespeare – Desdemona's handkerchief a gift to Othello's mother is a gift from an "Egyptian charmer" who can almost read the thoughts of people.
1611: The Tempest by Shakespeare – Caliban, the only human inhabitant of the mythical island, is thought to be named after the word Kaliban meaning "black" or "with blackness" in Anglo-Romani. As the first Romani immigrants arrived in England a century before Shakespeare wrote The Tempest, it is thought he may have been influenced by looks and exoticised them.
 1613: Miguel de Cervantes' novel La Gitanilla
 1631: Ben Jonson's play Bartholomew Fair.  A comedy set in London's Bartholomew Fair where a band of Romani entertain a crowd.
 1722: Daniel Defoe's Moll Flanders.  Moll's earliest memory is of wandering "among a group of people they call Gypsies or Egyptians" in England.
 1798: William Wordsworth's poem, The Female Vagrant from Lyrical Ballads.  A young homeless woman is welcomed by a band of Roma who take her in and offer her charity and companionship.

19th century 
 19th century: Guy de Maupassant's short stories.  Romani appear in several short stories by the French writer.
 19th century: John Clare's Vagabond in a Native Place.  A selection of poems romanticizing the lives, culture, and wanderings of the English Romami people.
 1815: Jane Austen's Emma.  Roma make a brief appearance in Emma as children who bait Harriet in a lonely lane. Austen's description of the Romani is romanticized.
 1815: Walter Scott's novel Guy Mannering.
 1823:  Scott's novel Quentin Durward. Called Bohemians.
 1824: Alexander Sergeyevich Pushkin's poem The Gypsies. 
 1831: Victor Hugo's novel The Hunchback of Notre Dame
 1835: Karel Hynek Mácha's novel Cikáni (Gypsies; because of problems with a censorship, it was published only in 1857).
 1841: Charles Dickens's The Old Curiosity Shop.  Describes the first literary mention of an English Romanichal vardo or wagon.
 1845: Robert Browning's "The Flight of the Duchess," loosely inspired by the English ballad The Raggle Taggle Gypsy. A Duchess runs away from her husband after speaking with an old Traveller woman.
 1845: Prosper Mérimée's short story "Carmen", upon which the opera was based.
 1847: Emily Brontë's novel Wuthering Heights. Heathcliff is described as looking like a Romani man and is presumed to be one by several characters, although this is never confirmed.
 1847: Charlotte Brontë's Jane Eyre. English Romanies set up camp near Thornfield Hall, later Rochester disguises himself as an old Romani fortune teller in order to get Jane to confide her feelings for him.
 1853: Matthew Arnold's "The Scholar Gypsy".  A poem based on a legend recounted by Joseph Glanvill in The Vanity of Dogmatizing (1661), on the thoughts and reflections of Roma people's relationship with God.
 1853: Józef Ignacy Kraszewski's "Chata za wsią (Polish)" "The Cottage behind the Village." Realistic depiction of Roma in Poland in the 1800s.
 1856: Elizabeth Barrett Browning's verse novel Aurora Leigh.  Marian Erle is Rom.
 1857: George Borrow's novels Lavengro and The Romany Rye
 1860: George Eliot's The Mill on the Floss. The protagonist Maggie runs away to Roma, but decides she has gone out of her depth. They do not harm her, but the episode darkly prefigures the steps that she will take in adulthood.
 1891: J. M. Barrie's novel The Little Minister. A young Scottish minister falls in love with a wild Roma girl.
 1892: Arthur Conan Doyle's Sherlock Holmes story, "The Adventure of the Speckled Band". Dr. Grimesby Roylott is established as being friendly with a group of wandering Romani, and gives them permission to encamp om his estate. At the start of the story, Holmes speculates that there will be a connection between the death of Helen Stoner's sister and the Romani (among other things). When Dr. Watson questions what the Romani might have done, Holmes responds that he cannot imagine. Dr. Watson responds with "I see many objections to any such theory", which Holmes admits to also seeing. In the end, the Romani are shown to have had no involvement in the death of Helen's sister. The story ends with Holmes admitting his mistake, noting that it shows "how dangerous it always is to reason from insufficient data".
 1892: Maxim Gorky's short story "Makar Chudra" (Макар Чудра). A love story between the Roma girl Rada and the horse thief Zobar.
 1897: Bram Stoker's Dracula.  Features a group of Romanies working for the Count.

20th century 
 1902: E. Nesbit's Five Children and It. The children run into a band of English Roma on the road.
 1908: Kenneth Grahame's The Wind in the Willows.  Toad, owner of Toad Hall, an impulsive and conceited character, buys a horse-drawn English Romami vardo. Toad later trades a stolen horse to a Roma for food.
 1911: Saki's short story "Esme" (included in The Chronicles of Clovis).  Features a degrading depiction of a Traveller child that is used to foreground the heartless nature of the English aristocrats.
 1926: D. H. Lawrence's The Virgin and the Gypsy.  A young Romani hero is a useful antidote to a rigid social class system.
 1930: Hermann Hesse's novel Narcissus and Goldmund.  Features a Romani girl called Lisa.
 1943–1978:   Malcolm Saville's Lone Pine books.  A Roma family (Reuben, Miranda and Fenella) are friends and allies of the Lone Pine Club's members especially of the club's vice captain Petronella Sterling.
 1940: Ernest Hemingway's For Whom the Bell Tolls.  Featured a Romani named Rafael.
 1946:  The Ursitory, the first novel by the French writer (of Romani ethnicity) Mateo Maximoff is published in France.  The English-language edition (published in England in 1949) claims it to be "the first novel ever written by Gypsy."
 1947:  The Nancy Drew Mystery Story The Clue in the Old Album.  Some of the main characters are Roma.
 1951: Hergé's The Adventures of Jo, Zette and Jocko comic book Destination New York.  Features several Romani characters in a very sympathetic manner.
 1956: Dodie Smith's The Hundred and One Dalmatians.  After escaping from Cruella De Vil's country house, the dogs are nearly trapped by an old Roma woman who wants to sell them. Her horse helps the dogs escape again.
 1957: Ian Fleming's James Bond novel From Russia, with Love.  Set in a Romani encampment in Turkey, features a fight to the death between two Roma girls vying for the affection of the same man.
 1958:   Elizabeth Goudge's The White Witch.  Features a description of the lifestyle of the Romnichals of the UK during the civil war.
 1959: Ludwig Bemelmans's Madeline and the Gypsies
 1963: Hergé's The Adventures of Tintin comic book The Castafiore Emerald.  Features several Romani characters and a few Romani words. This graphic novel is very sympathetic to the Romani characters.
 1967: Gabriel García Márquez's One Hundred Years of Solitude.
 1969-1981: Swedish writer and Romani civil rights leader Katarina Taikon publishes her series of autobiographical children's book about Romani girl Katitzi. In the 1976 book Katitzi Z-1234, set in 1945 (ending with people celebrating the end of World War II), Katitzi meets a Roma woman named Zoni. Zoni is a survivor of Auschwitz, and tells the young Katitzi about the horrors of the Romani holocaust.
 1971, 1972: Martin Cruz Smith's Gypsy in Amber and Canto for a Gypsy.
 1972: Rumer Godden's children's book The Diddakoi (also published as Gypsy Girl).  Winner of the Whitbread Award. Adapted for television by the BBC as Kizzy.
 1975: Roald Dahl's children's book Danny, the Champion of the World.  A young boy lives with his father in a traditional English vardo, although it is unclear if the protagonist Danny and his father are themselves Romanichal and admire the culture or prefer the lifestyle.
 1978–present: The Star Wars expanded universe books.  A race of aliens known as the Ryn possess many stereotypical Roma traits, including clan family structures, wanderer natures, reputations as thieves and more.
 1981, 1988: Robertson Davies's novels The Rebel Angels and The Lyre of Orpheus.  Feature major characters who maintain Romani traditions, including the care and repair of musical instruments, in modern Canada.
 1983: Tim Powers' novel The Anubis Gates.  Features a band of Romanies led by Egyptian magicians and utilizes quite a few expressions from the Romani language.
 1984: Stephen King's novel Thinner.   Includes the classic plot device of the Romani curse. It was also made into a movie.
 1984-2013: Robert Jordan's fantasy series The Wheel of Time features a race of Romani-like people called the Tinkers, who travel in caravans and practice strict pacifism.
 1985: Charles de Lint's novel Mulengro.   Contemporary fantasy portrayal of the Romani and their cultural myths.
 1986: Robert Silverberg's Star of Gypsies.  A sci-fi epic about the King of the Romanies searching out the long lost Romany home star system.
 1987: Piers Anthony's Incarnations of Immortality series.  The latter half features the Romani in a hugely positive light, most prominent in Being A Green Mother.
 1987: John Crowley's Ægypt cycle.  Much of the narrative of unfolds from an encounter with a Roma fortune-teller, and revolves around the question of why people believe Romanies can tell the future.
1987: Isobelle Carmody's Obernewtyn series. A fantasy fiction novel about the land of men and beings destroyed by what they call the "Great White". This story includes many Romani, and how the townspeople are very jealous of their very good living.
 1988–present: Mercedes Lackey's Valdemar series. Features a fictional race of people based loosely on the Romani, even to the extent of using Romani language; most prominent in the Vows and Honor books.
 1991: Young Indiana Jones and the Gypsy Revenge (UK title: Young Indiana Jones and the Crusader's Crown), a young adult novel in the Indiana Jones franchise. Set in 1914 France, a 15-year-old Indiana Jones encounters a young, beautiful Romani fortune teller.
 1992: Joe Gores's novel 32 Cadillacs.  The DKA investigate a network of American Romani criminals.
 1995: The Parsley Parcel by Elizabeth Arnold is a children's novel set among Roma in the English New Forest and was the basis for a seven-part Gypsy Girl TV series in 2001.
 1995-2000: Philip Pullman's His Dark Materials trilogy.  Features a nomadic race called the "Gyptians". Gyptians are roughly the equivalent of Roma in our universe, with the exception that they use narrowboats in place of caravans. Throughout the books they are portrayed as good and kindly people.
 1996-2001: Tad Williams's Otherland series of science fiction books.  A Romani character and references to Romani appear as nomads who disregard the borders of an advanced virtual reality cyberspace.
 1999: Bernard Ashley's novel Johnnie's Blitz features a Roma family.
 1999: Ana Castillo's novel Peel My Love Like an Onion.
 1999: Thomas Harris's novel Hannibal.  A member of a seemingly Romani band of travellers is hired by Inspector Pazzi to pickpocket Hannibal Lecter, in order to lift a fingerprint.
 1999: Joanne Harris's novel Chocolat (and the 2000 film based on the novel), features a group of French river Roma.
 1999–2003: In the Star Wars New Jedi Order series of books, the Ryn race are inspired by the Roma.

21st century 
 2001: Jacqueline Carey's Kushiel's Legacy series of fantasy novels.  Includes the Tsingani, based on the Roma.
 2001: James Herbert's novel Once.  A wiccan called Nell Quick is described as alluring and dressed in the manner of a Roma woman. She is noted for her extremely beautiful looks and raven-colored dark hair. The novel never fully explains her origins or if she is connected to the Gypsies.
 2003: Louise Doughty's novel Fires in the Dark.  A boy from a group of nomadic Kalderash Roma, born in a barn in rural Bohemia in 1927, grows up during the Great Depression and the rise of Nazism, is interned in a camp and escapes to take part in the Prague Uprising of May 1945.
 2005:   Isabel Allende's novel Zorro.  Features a clan of Romanies who ally themselves with the titular hero in post-Napoleonic Spain.
 2005:   Edith Layton's novel Gypsy Lover.  Daffyd, the illegitimate son of a noblewoman and a Romani, returns to England from a penal colony in Botany Bay to pardon and clear the name of his adopted father the Earl of Egremont.
 2006: Louise Doughty's novel Stone Cradle charts one family's path through persecution and tragedy, asking, can the Romani spirit survive in a century that no longer has space for them?
 2006–present: Rob Thurman's Cal Leandros novel series.  The lead character and his brother are both half-Romani on their mother's side.
 2007: Lisa Kleypas's novel Mine Till Midnight and its companion Seduce Me at Sunrise.  Feature two half-Romani male protagonists.
 2007:  Nikki Poppen's The Romany Heiress.  The heir to the Earl of Spelthorne is captivated by the arrival of a beautiful Roma shows up on his doorstep claiming to be his deceased parents' long lost daughter.
 2007: Colum McCann's novel Zoli.  Explores the life of a fictional Slovak Romani artist.
 2007: Paulo Coelho's novel The Witch of Portobello.  The character Athena's biological mother is Roma.
 2007:  In Sally Gardner's novel The Red Necklace, the main character Yann and his companion Têtu are Roma along with the antagonist Kalliovski.
2007: Deanna Raybourn's Lady Julia Grey series (Silent in the Grave, Silent in the Sanctuary, Silent on the Moor, Dark Road to Darjeeling, Dark Inquiry) feature Nicholas Brisbane as the protagonist. Brisbane is the son of a reprobate Scottish nobleman and a Roma woman with the power of sight. Throughout the series, a number of Roma characters feature prominently.
 2007, 2008:  Kate Wild's teenage/young adult novels FightGame and FireFight.  Thrillers with a science fiction overtone featuring a young Roma protagonist called Freedom Smith.
 2008: James Rollins' novel The Last Oracle. Cmdr. Gray Pierce must stop a rogue group in Russia from using autistic savant Romani descendants from being used as weapons.
 2010:  Sonia Meyer's novel Dosha, Flight of the Russian Gypsies. About Romani in the 1950s Soviet Union.
 2010: Levi Pinfold's children's book The Django (2010), inspired by Romani musician Django Reinhardt
 2011: Stef Penney's novel The Invisible Ones. Ray Lovell, a small-time PI of Roma descent, is hired to investigate the disappearance of a Romani woman, 7 years previously.
 2013: Cazzarola! Anarchy, Romani, Love, Italy by Norman Nawrocki includes a Romani family and camp living in Rome, Italy. Talks about the persecution and discrimination the Romani face in Europe.
 2015: Linda De Quincey's novel Roma: Charlie and Poppy. The tale of an orphaned Romany child who is adopted by an abusive mother and falls for his adoptive sister who lifts his spirits as he plans his escape.

Plays and musicals 
 Carmen, an 1875 opera by Georges Bizet. It is set in southern Spain and tells the story of the downfall of Don José, a naïve soldier who is seduced by the wiles of the fiery Carmen, a Romani woman. José abandons his childhood sweetheart and deserts from his military duties, yet loses Carmen's love to the glamorous torero Escamillo, after which José kills her in a jealous rage.
 Notre-Dame de Paris, a 1998 musical based on the 1831 novel The Hunchback of Notre Dame by Victor Hugo.
 The Hunchback of Notre Dame, a 1999 musical adapted from the 1996 Walt Disney Animation Studios film adaptation of Victor Hugo's 1831 novel.
 Klokkeren fra Notre Dame (The Hunchback of Notre Dame), a 2002 Danish musical written and composed by Knud Christensen (better known as Sebastian), based on the Hugo novel.

Other media 
 The Cirque du Soleil traveling show Varekai takes its name from the Romani language and the characters represented on stage are loosely based on the nomadic way of life associated with the Romani people.
 Warhammer Fantasy includes an ethnic group of humans, the Strigany, who are often referred to as gypsies. They conflate the Romani with Romanians: the Strigany are from the same geographical area as Romania, and negative stereotypes about the Romani people are justified against the Strigany, who are persecuted for vampire worship and sometimes actually enabling the Undead.
 The Curse of Strahd supplement for Dungeons & Dragons includes a fantasy version of the Romani, the Vistani. Early printings portrayed the Vistani in a stereotyped light.

Songs
 "Zigenarvän" (Eng: "Gypsy Friend". 1969) – Agnetha Fältskog (later of ABBA fame): featured on the album Agnetha Fältskog Vol. 2, the song tells of a young woman's visit to a Romani camp. The young woman finds herself drawn to the Romani camp one night. The light from their fire leads the way. From a distance, the young woman can hear their laughter, singing and music. She attends a Romani wedding, and dances with the bride's brother (whom she falls in love with). She returns the next day, only to find it gone. The young woman is left wondering if it was all just a dream. The song was the album's biggest hit, but its overly romantic lyrics became the source of controversy. Its release coincided with a heated debate about Romani people in the Swedish media, and Fältskog was accused of deliberately trying to make money out of the situation by writing the song.

Music videos
 "Rock 'n' Roll Children" (1985) – Dio: a young couple, both aspiring rock musicians, seek shelter from a rainstorm in an antique store, after an argument. The store is run by a Romani-esque mystic (Ronnie James Dio), who keeps out of their sight. The couple go into a closet, entering another world, where they are separated. Through a crystal ball, the mystic observes the couple, while they're being subjected to discrimination, exclusion, and demands from others to give up their way of life and culture. After the couple are reunited, and rekindle their love (while hostile people begins to circle around them), the mystic smashes the crystal ball onto the floor, releasing them from the other world.
 "Who's That Girl" (1987) – Madonna: Madonna goes to visit a Romani fortune-teller. The fortune-teller shows Madonna a tarot card, with a moving (cartoon) image, and mysteriously disappears.
 "Love to Hate You" (1991) – Erasure: the video features a group of female dancers, wearing Romani dress.
 "Ain't It Funny" (2001) – Jennifer Lopez: Lopez comes across a Romani camp, where a fortune-teller reads her future. Young Romani women comes and makes over Lopez into one of them. In the camp, Lopez finds an irresistible man, and falls in love with him. She then performs a flamenco-influenced routine.

Comics

DC Comics
 Dick Grayson (a.k.a. Robin and Nightwing) was established to be of Romani descent in 2015.
 Zatanna Zatara, a superheroine and magic user, is of Romani descent on her father's side. Her powers originate from her Homo Magi heritage (through her non-Roma mother), an off-shoot of humanity capable of naturally manipulating magic energies. Zatanna's father, Giovanni "John" Zatara, is also a superhero. He made his debut in Action Comics #1 (the same issue as Superman).
 Nimue Inwudu (Madame Xanadu) is a Romani mystic and fortune teller. Madame Xanadu has the appearance of a stereotypical Romani fortune teller who wears dangly earrings.
 Cynthia Reynolds styles herself after the stereotypical image of Romani women and adopts "Gypsy" as her superhero identity. In her first appearance, the character is introduced as a petty thief, and a trickster. In 2013, a revamped version of the character is shown acquiring her alias from Amanda Waller, who tells her "You seem to prefer a more nomadic existence. That makes you something of a trans-dimensional... gypsy.".
 Tora Olafsdotter (Ice) was originally presented as a princess of an isolated tribe of magic-wielding Norsemen. In the 2010 series Justice League: Generation Lost, that origin is revealed to have been a lie. It is revealed that Tora was born Romani. Her grandfather was the leader of a clan of Romani criminals in Norway. When Tora began manifesting her cryokinetic powers, her parents feared that her grandfather would try using her for crime, and fled from the clan. Tora had made up her previous origin story, upon becoming a superhero, to make herself more acceptable to the world (stating that heroes come from better stock than her).

Film & Television Adaptations
 The animated TV series Justice League Unlimited (2004-2006) features Cynthia Reynolds/Gypsy as a recurring, non-speaking, background member of the Justice League. The character dressed in the stereotypical image of Romani women.
 The Smallville season six episode "Crimson" (aired 1 February 2007), features a young Romani woman named Star. She gives Lois Lane a lipstick (partially made from Red Kryptonite), that causes Lois to fall madly in love (obsessed) with Clark Kent. In one scene, Star claims to be psychic, and says Clark's name (despite no one having told his name to her), while also (accurately) predicting that Lois and Clark will eventually become a couple. She is also shown to run a New Age-style shop. When Henry James Olsen (older brother of Jimmy Olsen) seeks her out, and asks if Star's got a counter agent for the lipstick, Star happily gives it (made from Green kryptonite) to him. Star is established to have made both the lipstick and counter agent herself (using different types of kryptonite). Within the context of the series, Green kryptonite was well-established to have a mutagenic effect on humans, granting them different superhuman powers, including telepathy and precognition. A Smallville High School yearbook page suggests that Star's real name is Tonya Hartz, a telepath (presumably from exposure to Green Kryptonite). Tonya had briefly appeared in an earlier episode, where she was part of Clark Kent's graduating class (explaining how Star knew Clark's name).
 The 2010 animated film Justice League: Crisis on Two Earths features an evil version of superheroine Cynthia Reynolds/Gypsy, from an alternate universe. This version goes by "Gypsy Woman", and dresses in the stereotypical image of Romani women.
 The animated TV series Young Justice features Nimue Inwudu (Madame Xanadu) as an occasional guest character. The series changes Madame Xanadu to African-American.
 In the 2012 film The Dark Knight Rises, Tom Hardy portrays the terrorist Bane. In the comics, Bane is Latino, which Hardy is not. Fearing possible objections to that, Hardy and Christopher Nolan decided to change Bane to Romani.
 The CW TV Series The Flash features Cynthia/Gypsy in a recurring role, played by Jessica Camacho. She is the daughter of Breacher (Danny Trejo). Cynthia and Breacher are both depicted as Latin. Cynthia is said to have taken the moniker "Gypsy" to make herself sound moody and mysterious.
 The 2019 Swamp Thing TV series features Nimue Inwudu (Madame Xanadu). Nimue is portrayed by Jeryl Prescott, with the character being changed to African-American.

Marvel Comics
 Superheroes (originally supervillains) and twins Wanda Maximoff (Scarlet Witch) and Pietro Maximoff (Quicksilver) have had several origin stories over the decades, but have consistently been linked to the Romani people. In 1979, the twins were revealed to have been raised by Romani couple Django and Marya Maximoff, as part of their tribe. Their biological mother was established to be a Romani woman named Magda. In 1982, the twins biological father was revealed to be the Jewish mutant Magneto, whom Magda has met when they had both been imprisoned in a concentration camp. In 2014, Marvel Comics retconned the twins origin. Their biological parents were no longer Magda and Magneto. In 2016, the twins were revealed to be the children of Natalya Maximoff (an earlier Scarlet Witch), a Romani woman and sister of Django Maximoff. In the late 1990s, artist George Perez gave Scarlet Witch a new costume, that put an emphasis on her Romani identity (explained in-universe as her feeling more in tune with her Romani heritage). She would also wear civilian clothes, that visually highlighted her ethnicity. Scarlet Witch and Quicksilver were introduced as reluctant members of the supervillain team the Brotherhood of Mutants. They had joined to team, after Magneto had saved Wanda from an angry mob (after she had set fire to a building, with her mutant powers (which ignorant villagers mistook for witchcraft and labeled Wanda a "Scarlet Witch"), by accident), leaving the twins in his debt. About a year after their original introduction, Scarlet Witch and Quicksilver became members of the superhero team the Avengers. While Quicksilver's come and gone from the team over the years, Scarlet Witch has been a longtime Avengers mainstay, having even served as leader of the team.
 Pietro Maximoff has a daughter named Luna Maximoff, together with Crystal (a member of the Inhumans).
 Wanda Maximoff once had twin sons, named William and Thomas, with the android superhero Vision. William and Thomas were eventually erased from existence, but were reincarnated as Young Avengers members Billy Kaplan (Wiccan) and Tommy Shepherd (Speed).
 Canonical origin of the supervillain Doctor Doom of the Romani people, and was driven to his nominally villainous actions as a response to the persecution of his family. As dictator of the fictional nation of Latveria, Doom has taken a special interest in the welfare of Gypsies, as that is his heritage, and often that race is first to be taken care of in a manner similar to Saddam Hussein showering his Tikriti tribe with benefits.
 Cynthia Von Doom, who was the mother of Doctor Doom, and a Romani witch.
 Werner Von Doom, healer and father of Doctor Doom. 
 Meggan of the superhero team Excalibur was born to a band of Romanies in England. She was expelled when they saw that she was a shapeshifter, and believed her to be a demon.
 Margali Szardos, the foster-mother of Kurt Wagner (Nightcrawler) of the superhero teams Excalibur and X-Men, is a French Romani sorceress.
 Superheroine Amanda Sefton (real name Jimaine Szardos), also known as Daytripper and the second Magik, the daughter of Margali Szardos. Like her mother, Amanda is a Romani sorceress.
 Astrid Mordo, the daughter of Baron Mordo, with a Romani woman named Lilia Calderu.
 Elena, the Romani great-grandmother of superheroes Colossus (Piotr Rasputin) and Magik (Illyana Rasputina), and supervillain Mikhail Rasputin. Elena was one of the many lovers of Grigori Rasputin (the great-grandfather of Colossus, Illyana, and Mikhail).
 Colossus (Piotr Rasputin) is a mutant, and a member of the superhero teams Excalibur and X-Men.
 Magik (Illyana Rasputina) is a mutant and a capable sorceress, who've been a member of the superhero teams New Mutants and X-Men.
 Mikhail Rasputin is a mutant supervillain, and former Cosmonaut.
 Lianda, a Romani healer, and vampire. In the 15th Century, a dying Vlad Dracula was placed in her care. As punishment for his persecution of the Romani people, Lianda turned Dracula into a vampire.
 Nocturne (Talia Wagner), a mutant superhero, and the daughter of Nightcrawler and the Scarlet Witch, from an alternate universe.
 Valeria, a Romani woman from Latveria. Valeria grew up in the same camp as Victor von Doom, and was romantically involved with Victor during their teenage years. They were separated when Victor went as a student to the United States. Valeria was reunited with Victor (now the supervillain Doctor Doom), after she was kidnapped by the supervillain Diablo, who wanted to use her against him. Valeria was freed, but fled from Victor, upon realizing what sort of man that he had become (and that he was no longer the man whom she had once loved). Victor made many attempts to win Valeria's heart, which failed (even though the compassionate Valeria showed Victor kindness, after he was injured by the Hulk). Valeria fled Latveria, to get away from Victor. He sought her out, without his armor, and managed to win her heart. However, Victor had Valeria's life sacrificed for mystical power.

Film & Television Adaptations
 The animated TV Series Fantastic Four (1994-1996) features Dr. Doom in a recurring role. Flashbacks shows Doom being the son of a doctor and scientist, who would use his skills to help a Romani tribe in Latveria. The Romani are shown living in a camp, and depicted as simple folk who take the medical science of Doom's father for magic, and believe him to be a sorcerer. In one scene, three Romani men attempt to rob, and murder, Doom's father. Dr. Doom labels the Romani "superstitious fools". In one episode, Dr. Doom is shown to have a loyal Romani henchwoman in his service.
 The animated TV Series Iron Man (1994-1996) features Wanda Maximoff/Scarlet Witch as a regular, and as a member of the superhero team Force Works. Scarlet Witch is referenced as being "Middle European", and occasionally uses tarot cards.
 X-Men: The Animated Series (1992-1997)
 A flashback in the season four episode "Nightcrawler" (aired 13 May 1995), shows a newborn Kurt Wagner being rescued by a Romani couple, after his biological mother (Mystique) left him for dead in a river. The Romani couple adopted Kurt as their own, and raised him as part of their small circus.
 The season four episode "Family Ties" (aired 4 May 1996) explores the origin of recurring characters Scarlet Witch and Quicksilver. They are established to have been raised by Romanian Romani couple Django and Marya Maximoff, after they were brought to the Maximoffs as newborns. Scarlet Witch and Quicksilver learn that they are the biological children of Magneto, and his wife Magda (not identified onscreen as Romani). A flashback depicts the Maximoffs as living in a house, as opposed to the stereotypical caravan.
 Alan Cumming portrays Kurt Wagner/Nightcrawler in the film X2 (2003). Kurt is depicted as a German, former circus performer, who was the victim of mind control by the film's villain. After being freed, he joins the X-Men. The role of Kurt Wagner was later recast with Kodi Smit-McPhee, who portrayed a younger Kurt in X-Men: Apocalypse (2016) and Dark Phoenix (2019). When first introduced in X-Men: Apocalypse, he is depicted as wearing Romani-esque clothing (upon coming to America, he gets different clothes), and a victim of an underground arena (which forces captured mutants to fight each other to the death). Kurt is rescued by Mystique (unlike in the comics, not indicated to be his biological mother), and joins the X-Men.
 Daniel Cudmore portrays Colossus in the films X2 (2003), X-Men: The Last Stand (2006), and X-Men: Days of Future Past (2014). Colossus is a minor character in the films (even after becoming a member of the X-Men), and no backstory is provided for the character.
 Julian McMahon portrays Victor von Doom in the films Fantastic Four (2005) and Fantastic Four: Rise of the Silver Surfer (2007). No reference is made to Victor being of Romani heritage. Fantastic Four: Rise of the Silver Surfer indicates that Victor hails from Latverian aristocracy.
 In the 2011 film Ghost Rider: Spirit of Vengeance, Danny Ketch is depicted as the son of a Romani woman named Nadya Ketch, and the demon Mephistopheles. Nadya had gotten involved with a man named Carrigan, who was a mercenary, drug dealer, and gun runner. She did not care what he was, all Nadya saw was a ticket out for herself (from what is never expanded upon). Nadya became mortally wounded, after one of Carrigan's deals went south (and she had attempted to escape). Nadya agreed to carry the child of Mephistopheles, in return for him saving her life. The film revolves around Johnny Blaze (Ghost Rider) attempting to protect Danny and Nadya from Mephistopheles. After Johnny's had his powers taken away from him, Danny uses his own powers to turn Johnny back into Ghost Rider. While Nadya and Danny are on the run from Carrigan (who is working for Mephistopheles), Nadya finds herself approached by a businessman (who removes a wedding ring). The businessman asks if she is Roma, and notes that he has heard things about Roma women (implied to be of a sexual nature). However, he backs away when Danny makes his presence known. Without the businessman noticing, Danny steals his wallet and wedding ring (so that businessman will have a lot of explaining to do with his wife). Afterwards, Nadya assures Danny that they will not always have to steal.
 Evan Peters portrays Peter Maximoff (an adaptation of Pietro Maximoff/Quicksilver) in the 20th Century Fox movies X-Men: Days of Future Past (2014), X-Men: Apocalypse (2016), and Dark Phoenix (2019). In X-Men: Days of Future Past, Peter is depicted as a petty thief, who lives with his mother and little sister (in the extended Rogue Cut, a second sister is referenced). In X-Men: Apocalypse, Peter is established as being the son of Erik Lehnsherr (Magneto), making him half-Jewish. What ethnicity Peter's mother hails from is never touched upon.
 In X-Men: Apocalypse, Magneto is shown living in Poland and have a daughter with his wife, Magda. The film never touched upon whether Magda is Romani, as she was in the comics. Magda and her daughter are killed off, which drives Magneto to ally himself with Apocalypse
 Elizabeth Olsen portrays Wanda Maximoff (Scarlet Witch) in the Marvel Cinematic Universe franchise (with Aaron Taylor-Johnson portraying Pietro Maximoff in the films Captain America: The Winter Soldier (post-credit sequence) and Avengers: Age of Ultron). As of her Disney+ limited series, WandaVision, no reference has been made to Wanda (and her twin brother) being of Romani heritage. In the WandaVision episode "All-New Halloween Spooktacular!", Wanda dresses up as a "Sokovian fortune-teller" (an outfit based on the classic Scarlet Witch costume from the comic books) for Halloween. The plot of WandaVision has Wanda use magic on a town. She brainwashes all the residents (turning them into sitcom characters), and separating parents from their children (acts rooted in anti-Romani stereotypes). When the locals are freed, one of the women (in tears) begs Wanda to let her be reunited with her daughter. In Doctor Strange in the Multiverse of Madness (directed by Drag Me to Hell director Sam Raimi) Wanda is shown attempting to steal the children of her alternate reality counterpart. Avengers: Age of Ultron introduces and depicts Wanda and Pietro as having been willing members of Hydra. Hydra is a fictional organization, that Captain America: The First Avenger introduced as the former science division of the Nazi Party. Scarlet Witch and Quicksilver were adapted for the Marvel Cinematic Universe by Joss Whedon, the creator of Buffy the Vampire Slayer. (For information on the depiction of Romani on Buffy the Vampire Slayer, and its spin-off, see under Television.) The casting of Elizabeth Olsen (a blond white woman) was met with backlash from fans, who felt that the character was being ruined by removing her Roma heritage. In a 2022 interview, Olsen stated that Scarlet Witch is not a role model, nor someone whom children should idolize.
 Stefan Kapičić voiced Colossus (the character appears through CGI) in Deadpool (2016) and Deadpool 2 (2018). While Kapičić's role is bigger than the Daniel Cudmore version, no backstory is provided for the character. In the films, Colossus tries to recruit Deadpool into the X-Men, and teaching him the morality of being a superhero.
 The television series Legion (2017-2019) depicts Gabrielle (the mother of series protagonist David Haller) as Romani (and, by extension, David Haller). In the comics, Gabrielle is Jewish. (For further information, see under Television.)
 Anya Taylor-Joy portrays Illyana Rasputin in the film The New Mutants (2020). Outside of being established as being a former victim of child trafficking, the film gives no backstory on Illyana. The trauma of her past as a trafficking victim is shown to have made Illyana distant and hostile towards others, though she gets close to the other young mutants at the institution (where they're all kept prisoners), even willing to save the others in the end. Throughout the film, Illyana is shown having a purple dragon hand puppet named Lockheed. During the climax, Lockheed transforms into a real dragon.

Other
 In the web comic The Science Table Comic, Alex, one of the recurring characters, is a gypsy and is adorned in what is stated by another character as his "Traditional native garbs."
Katerina Donlan of Gunnerkrigg Court is referred to as "gypsy" by another character. Tom Sidell, the comic's author, confirmed she is half-Roma, her mother belonging to the gitano ethnical group.

Anime and manga
 In the anime Blood +, it is implied that the character Haji is Roma. However, he was bought from his caravan at a young age and does not identify as such thereafter.
 In the anime Cowboy Bebop, the character Faye Valentine claims to be one of the Romani people, though this is later dispelled through her own personal flashbacks.
 In the anime Kaze to Ki no Uta, Serge Battour is the orphaned son of a viscount and a beautiful Roma woman.
 In the Code Geass OVA spinoff, Akito the Exiled, the main cast of characters encounter a group of elderly Romani.
 The Fullmetal Alchemist movie, Conqueror of Shamballa, features Romani women in Pre-Nazi Germany.

Video games
 The videogame Dragon Quest VIII: Journey of the Cursed King features Romani characters Kalderasha, named after the Kalderash, and his daughter Valentina.
 In the videogame Psychonauts and its sequel, Psychonauts 2, The main character, Razputin Aquato, and his family are Romani.
 In Assassin's Creed: Revelations, courtesan NPCs are replaced by Romanies which act as moving hiding spots and can be used to distract guards.
 The Crimson Skies character Nathan Zachary has claimed Romani heritage.
 The four protagonists of Mother Russia Bleeds are all referred to as Romani (their background is vague, but they were apparently raised in an impoverished Roma camp somewhere in Russia).
 The videogame Bohemian Killing features a Romani protagonist guilty of murder, who has to try and convince the jury he didn't do it.
 In Koudelka, the main protagonist Koudelka Iasant is a Romani young lady from Wales.

Television
 In the television series Car 54, Where Are You episode "The Gypsy Curse" (aired 12 November 1961), Maureen Stapleton plays a Romani matriarch telling fortunes from a storefront in Toody and Muldoon's precinct.  Stereotypical jokes abound. She lifts a guy's wallet, the father is a layabout, the children don't go to school, they pack up and move to another storefront in short order, etc.
 The Dennis the Menace episode "Dennis in Gypsyland" (aired 4 November 1962), featured a group of Romanies who visited Dennis's town, were accused of theft, and almost inveigled police Officer Murphy into marrying one of their women, to whom he had offered bread at dinner.
 In The Andy Griffith Show episode "The Gypsies" (aired 21 February 1966), a family of Romanies (one of whom is played by Jamie Farr) places a curse on the town of Mayberry.
 The Hunchback of Notre Dame (1966), a seven episode adaptation of the 1831 novel by Victor Hugo, done for British television. Although some photographs exist, no recordings of the production are known to have survived.
 In The Monkees episode "Son of a Gypsy" (aired 26 December 1966), a family of Romanies lose an audition to The Monkees, whom they proceed to invite back to their camp and force them to steal a valuable statue.
 Bombi Bitt och jag (1968) (Eng: Bombi Bitt and Me). A Swedish mini series focusing on a respectable young boy named Eli, and his friend Edvin/Bombi Bitt (Stellan Skarsgård), a wild rascal (whom parents forbid their children from being friends with), in the early days of the 20th Century. Bombi Bitt is depicted a child left to look after himself, and is disinterested in the knowledge gained from books (implied to be illiterate) The narration, for the first episode, establishes that Bombi Bitt's mother (Margaretha Krook) is a dispised woman, who lives with her son in a tiny cottage, and commits fornication with "tattare" (an ethnic slur for Romani people in Sweden, usually used for the Roma group known as Travellers). The narration states that the identity of Bombi Bitt's father is unknown (though, as his mother is said to sleep with Travellers, it is possible that the boy's father was one). It is left unclear if Bombi Bitt's mother is a Traveller herself. She is depicted as a dark woman, who drinks, is abusive towards her son, and sleeps around. Together with two men, she plots to steal the church silver, but their plan is foiled by Bombi Bitt and Eli. With the aid of the church keys (which they acquire with the aid of a bottle of moonshine, that Bombi Bitt says was dropped by some Traveller), the boys move and hide the church silver before the heist. Towards the end of the series, Eli and Bombi Bitt head to the market in Kivik. At the market, a group of Kalderash (one of whom is played by Romani singer and civil rights activist Hans Caldaras) sing and dance for the visitors.The Kalderash Roma sing in the Romani language, and are never shown being able to speak Swedish. At the market, there is also a Traveller husband and wife, who work with horse castration. The husband is depicted as a drunk, who pulls a knife at people. The wife pulls up her skirt in front of a full crowd.
 In the Scooby-Doo, Where Are You! episode "A Gaggle of Galloping Ghosts" (aired 22 November 1969), Scooby and the gang  come across a "gypsy wagon" while driving, and have their fortunes told by an apparent Romani fortune teller.
 In the Mission: Impossible episode "Gitano" (aired 1 February 1970), the IMF team is tasked with protecting young King Victor of Sardia (Barry Williams) from assassination. Among the agents, selected by Jim Phelps (Peter Graves) for the mission is IMF agent Zorka (Margarita Cordova), a Romani woman and flamenco dancer. For the mission, team regulars Paris (Leonard Nimoy) and William "Willy" Armitage (Peter Lupus) disguise themselves as Romani men. The team intercepts Victor, shortly before his intended assassination. The team splits up, with Zorka, Paris, and Willy transporting Victor in a caravan. To protect Victor, they disguise him as a young Romani girl.
 In the Hogan's Heroes episode "The Gypsy" (aired 13 December 1970), LeBeau (Robert Clary) is almost struck by lightning. The other POWs see this as an opportunity for one of their schemes. Knowing that Colonel Klink (Werner Klemperer) believes in fortunes, they have LeBeau pretend to have Romani ancestry, and that the lightning caused the psychic powers of his blood to become active. Hogan's Heroes is set in a German POW camp, during World War II.
 The Canterville Ghost (1974) Television dramatization –  Based on the (1887) short story by Oscar Wilde. An English gypsy group are suspected of kidnapping a girl but are innocent and join in the search.
 M*A*S*H (1972–1983):
 In "Hawkeye Get Your Gun" (aired 30 November 1976), Max Klinger (Jamie Farr) attempts to get out of the army by claiming to be "Zoltan, King of the Gypsies", and dresses up in stereotypical Romani clothes. Colonel Potter (Harry Morgan) questions how Klinger could be "King of the Gypsies", when he's Lebanese. Klinger insists that he was stolen from the Romani people by two ruthless Lebanese peasants, who raised him as theirs (and have now admitted to the truth). Potter does not buy the story. Klinger, refusing to give up, says that: "Now I know why the sound of violins set my blood on fire. Why I'm so attracted to storefront windows. Why, when I smell paprika, I face towards Budapest. Why I have the urge to roam". Klinger spends the rest of the episode pretending to be a Romani fortune-teller, and claims to be "Working on a plan to turn the motor pool into a Gypsy caravan". In one scene, Major Burns asks Klinger where some tape is. Klinger assures Burns that "Just 'cause I'm a Gypsy doesn't mean I stole it".
 In "The Yalu Brick Road" (aired November 19, 1979), the whole camp is affected by a salmonella epidemic after eating a bad Thanksgiving turkey, acquired by Klinger. When Majors Winchester and Houlihan (who had been away during the dinner) are informed of the situation, Major Winchester states that "any fool would know better than to actually eat Gypsy poultry".
 In "Yessir, That's Our Baby" (aired 31 December 1979), Klinger states that he understands babies. He adds: "It's the Gypsy in my soul".
 In "Settling Debts" (aired 6 December 1982), Colonel Potter tells the story of how he and his wife, Mildred, bought their house. He recalls that it had been Mildred's idea to buy one (previously, they had been living in rented houses on military bases). According to Colonel Potter, Mildred had "said that she was tired of livin' like a Gypsy".
 The Muppet Show (1976-1981):
 In the episode guest starring Peter Sellers (aired 1 January 1978), the opening number casts Sellers as a "demented Gypsy violinist". The number has Sellers dressed as a stereotypical Romani man, and features a stereotypical caravan on stage. The episode was made available on Disney+, with a content advisory attached to the episode: “This program includes negative depictions and/or mistreatment of people or cultures. These stereotypes were wrong then and are wrong now. Rather than remove this content, we want to acknowledge its harmful impact, learn from it and spark conversation to create a more inclusive future together.”
In the episode guest starring Jonathan Winters (aired 8 February 1980), the show is placed under a curse by a stereotypically dressed "Old Gypsy Lady" muppet, causing accidents and, eventually, results in everyone talking mock-Swedish (like the Swedish Chef). Jonathan Winters runs around terrified of the "Gypsy curse". The "Old Gypsy Lady" muppet performs several musical numbers, alongside other muppets, dressed in stereotypical Romani dress. One of the songs she performs is the song "Golden Earrings" from the 1947 film of the same name. The episode was made available on Disney+, with a content advisory attached to the episode: “This program includes negative depictions and/or mistreatment of people or cultures. These stereotypes were wrong then and are wrong now. Rather than remove this content, we want to acknowledge its harmful impact, learn from it and spark conversation to create a more inclusive future together.”
 Katitzi (1979-1980), A Swedish mini series, which aired on SVT2. It was an adaptation of writer and civil rights leader Katarina Taikon's autobiographical children's books, about Katitzi (played in the series by Sema Sari), a young Romani girl in Sweden (during the first half of the 20th century). Janne ”Loffe" Carlsson portrayed Katitzi's father, while Monica Zetterlund portrayed her stepmother. Taikon co-wrote the scripts, with Romani singer (and fellow activist) Hans Caldaras providing the music.
 In Jim Henson's Fraggle Rock (1983-1987), the sentient anthropomorphic Trash Heap refers to herself as a 'gypsy Trash Heap' when she performs her only act of magic. The character "The Old Gypsy Woman" appears in several episodes.
 In The Adventures of Sherlock Holmes episode "The Speckled Band" (aired 29 May 1984), the vandering Romani tribe (that Dr. Grimesby Roylott allows to stay on the grounds of his estate) plays a bigger role than in the original short story. In the short story, they are only mentioned, and briefly serve as a red herring in regard to the death of Helen Stoner's sister. In the episode, the tribe is introduced as thieves, and shown moving around the grounds of the estate with shotguns. Dr. Watson, rather than Sherlock Holmes, speculates that the Romani tribe might've had some involvement in the death of Helen's sister. Unlike in the short story, this theory does not spark instant objections from either Holmes or Watson.
 In the MacGyver episode "Thief of Budapest" (aired 13 October 1985), MacGyver goes to Budapest to get information from a Russian double-agent named Grotsky (in the form of a pocket watch, that contains a list of Soviet spies in the U.S.). While waiting for Grotsky, MacGyver catches a young Romani girl named Jana (Kelly McClain) try and pick his pocket (and take his Swiss Army knife). A few minutes later, Jana picks the pocket of Grotsky (taking the pocket watch), right before Grotsky is run over by a truck, when the KGB shows up and tries to arrest him (and prevent the information from ending up in American hands). When the KGB realizes that Jana stole the pocket watch, they have her father and brothers arrested (sending them to a prison for political prisoners, wanting Jana's family to tell them where Jana (who was away and busy trying to run from MacGyver when the police showed up) is). McGyver helps Jana get her family out of the prison. Afterwards, MacGyver seeks out a Romani fence named Reena (Sue Kiel), whom one of Jana's brothers had sold the pocket watch to. At first, Reena wants money for the pocket watch, but ends up giving it to MacGyver for free (and shows him a way out her establishment, away from the police and the KGB). Due to Jana and her family having helped him, MacGyver helps them out of the country (and arranges for them to go to the United States). When MacGyver and Jana says goodbye, he gives her his Swiss Army knife (and she gives him her necklace). While at the prison, one of Jana's brothers is harassed by an antiziganistic guard, who compares Romani people to mongrel dogs and says that it is a public service to kill Romani people. Seeing this from a distance, Jana asks MacGyver "Why do they hate us?". He answers: "Some people are scared of anybody who runs free". Jana's family are depicted as street musicians. In her first scene, after MacGyver catches her, she asks him if he's Romani (because "It takes a Gypsy to catch a Gypsy". A similar line is later said by Reena). He answers: "Not that I know of".
 In the Round the Twist episode "Lucky Lips" (aired 8 June 1990), Pete encounters a beautiful young Romani fortune teller (who in fact is an old lady) at a carnival, who gives him a magic lipstick that will attract any female.
 In the 'Allo 'Allo! episode "René of the Gypsies" (aired 9 March 1991), René and Edith visit a stereotypical Romani camp outside of the village, where they ask the Great Romany (the tribe's leader and a fortune-teller) to hold the tribe's annual fair in the village (intended as a cover for a Resistance operation). When the Great Romany reads Edith's palm, he becomes convinced that Edith is the long-lost Romani princess Romana (who, like Edith, had been left on a doorstep, and had an identical mark on her palm). However, he quickly changes his mind, upon hearing Edith's terrible singing voice (while Romana's mother had a great voice). He concludes that Edith's probably a distant cousin of Romana (noting that the tribe have left a lot of babies on doorsteps). The Romani tribe agrees to do the fair, but cancels after seeing a bad omen (a cat walking backward). Still needing the cover for the Resistance operation, the Resistance members dress up as Romani and hold the fair themselves. 'Allo 'Allo! is set during the German occupation of France during World War II, with the episode making no reference to Nazi antiziganism. The occupying Germans both gives permission for the fair, and happily attend it. Upon learning that she was likely born Romani, Edith expresses an attraction toward the Romani way of life, which she sums up as "Living here in the open air, singing round the campfire every evening".
 In the Married... with Children episode "Psychic Avengers" (aired 1 March 1992), the Bundy family sets up a scam psychic hotline called Madame Zelda. When their business grows large, they come into conflict with Madame Inga (Candice Azzara), a stereotypical Romani fortune-teller from Sweden, who is a real psychic. Madame Inga places a curse upon the Bundy family. Transforming them into monkeys, while their dog is transformed into a human.
 Heartbeat (1992–2010):
 In "Outsiders" (aired 29 May 1992), a Romani circus family arrives with their trailer in Aidensfield. The father of the family had been a local man, who had fallen in love with a Romani woman, and left the village of Aidensfield with her. In the episode, the couple (and their two sons) have returned to Aidensfield, as the father is about to die from cancer, and they wanted him to die in his home. The arrival of the family is met with antiziganism from both locals and the police force, with exception of Police constable Nick Rowan (who have recently moved with his wife to the village from London). Rowan refuses to get rid of the family, on the grounds that they haven't committed any crimes. A local vicar describes the situation with the Romani, as the problem not being so much what they do, as much as the prejudice that they bring out in people. During their stay in Aidensfield, the oldest son (Milos), becomes close to the vicar's daughter, Anna. Anna is engaged to a young local, who dislikes the Romani. Anna's fiancé tries to frame Milos for a series of crimes, but Rowan uncovers the plot, and Milos is proven innocent. At the end of the episode, the Romani family leaves Aidensfield. Anna, who has fallen in love with Milos, leaves with them.
 In "Expectations" (aired 10 September 1995), an old Romani woman comes to Aidensfield with her caravan. She is subjected to antiziganism from the locals, and has her caravan burned down by a teenaged troublemaker. The old woman reveals that she had a baby, at a young age, but was not allowed to keep her baby. She had then spent much of her life in institutions.
 "In On The Act" (aired 7 December 1997), a traveling fair comes to Aidensfield. One of the attractions is a stereotypical Romani fortune-teller named "Gipsy Sarah".
 In "The Traveller" (aired 3 December 2000), an English Traveller named Johnny Lee (David Essex) arrives with his trailer in Aidensfield. At the same time, a group of Irish Travellers, who Johnny notes have nothing to do with him, also arrives with their own caravans, trailers, and trucks for a horse fair (which Johnny also has come for). When Police Sergeant Craddock meets Johnny, Craddock uses the term "Gypsies". Johnny corrects him: "We call ourselves Travellers. It's only very rude and ignorant people who calls us Gypsies". The presence of Johnny and the Irish Travellers spark prejudice from Craddock, and the Aidensfield Arms landlord Oscar Blaketon, while most other locals treat them with kindness. The plot of the episode has Johnny encounter a young, and comically inept would-be robber named Nathaniel Cooper (who screwed up his first attempt at a robbery, and shot himself in the foot, then shot one of the tires of his getaway car). Realizing that Nathaniel is no real criminal, Johnny decides to hide Nathaniel from the police. However, when Nathaniel steals money from the Aidensfield Arms (an act that Blaketon is quick to blame the Travellers for), Johnny changes his mind about Nathaniel. He tells Nathaniel that he had no right to steal that money (which Johnny gives back to Blaketon), and asks Nathaniel to turn himself in, but Nathaniel refuses and leaves. Johnny then helps the police track down and apprehend Nathaniel. Meanwhile, the Irish Travellers, and the show's "lovable rogue" Claude Greengrass, organise an illegal trap-racing meeting in the streets of Aidensfield.
 In "Danse Macabre" (aired 27 July 2008), a Romani group arrives in Aidensfield. A local shop owner spots one of them, and tells her daughter not to let him in. The shop owner says: "I'm not having Gypsies in my shop". When a 15-year-old girl named Natalie disappears from a house, the butler of the house blames the Romani and states that "Gypsies steal children". However, Police constable Joe Mason (Joe McFadden) dismisses that notion as something that only happens in fairy tales. In an ironic twist, Natalie is revealed to be a Romani child (her father's among the newly arrived group, and she had run away to see him), whom the butler had taken from her family years earlier (with Natalie's father having spent ten years searching for her).
 In "Living Off The Land" (2 November 2008), PC Mason visits a camp of Travellers, who the episode seemingly mixes up with Hippies (called both "Travellers" and "Hippies" onscreen). They are shown living in tents and buses (the latter painted in Hippie-style). One of them tell PC Mason that: "We're Travellers. All we want is to be free, and live off the land".
 In the Dinosaurs episode "Little Boy Boo" (aired 30 October 1992), Robbie tells his little brother a scary tale, where Robbie becomes a werewolf-like creature called a "wereman". In the tale, their grandmother is cast as a stereotypical Romani fortune teller, complete with the caravan, crystal ball and tarot cards.
 In the Frasier episode "Retirement is Murder" (aired 10 January 1995), Bulldog meets Niles Crane for the first time. Upon meeting Niles, Bulldog bursts out laughing and tells Frasier: "Whoa! Another one just like you. Some gypsy put a curse on your family?".
 The Simpsons (1989–present):
 In "Lisa's Wedding" (aired 19 March 1995), Lisa Simpson is shown her future by a Romani fortune-teller. The fortune-teller specializes in foretelling doomed romances.
 In "Bart Carny" (aired 11 January 1998), a traveling carnival comes to Springfield. In one scene, Moe Szyslak has his fortune told by a Romani fortune-teller. The main plot of the episode revolves around a carny father and son duo (possibly Romani), who are depicted as con artists, and steals the Simpson house.
 In "Simpson Tide" (aired 29 March 1998), Milhouse Van Houten comes to school with an earring. Principal Skinner tells Milhouse that earrings are specifically forbidden by the school's dress code. When Skinner notes that people of Romani heritage are excepted from this rule, Milhouse claims to be Romani, which Skinner asks him to prove. In a faux Transylvanian accent, Milhouse says: "I 'vant' to suck your blood!". Skinner corrects Milhouse: "That's a vampire. But, uh, they're also covered".
In "Treehouse of Horror XII" (aired 6 November 2001), the Simpson family visit a Romani fortune teller. After Homer destroys the fortune teller's business, she places a curse on him (causing Homer's loved ones to be transformed or killed). In retaliation, Homer sics a leprechaun on the fortune teller. To Homer's surprise, the leprechaun and the fortune teller fall in love. At the end of the story, Homer and Marge attend their wedding (other guests include Kang and Kodos, hobgoblins, fairies, dragons, hobbits, ogres, with Yoda officiating the wedding). Marge (whom the curse has left covered in hair from head to toe) remarks that "The best thing about a Gypsy wedding is I'm not the hairiest woman here". When the fortune teller and the leprechaun first meet, they instantly start having sex. After they've just gotten married, they start doing it again, in full view of the wedding guests.
In "Treehouse of Horror XIII" (aired 	3 November 2002), The Simpson family and Ned Flanders hold a séance in the hope of communicating with the spirit of Maude Flanders. Marge dresses up as a Romani fortune-teller.
 In "The President Wore Pearls" (aired 16 November 2003), Lisa is elected student body president at Springfield Elementary. She declares an intention to take back the playground from the Romani people. The episode then cuts to a stereotypical Romani family, living on the Springfield Elementary playground. When two students are playing with a frisbee, a Romani man takes it mid-air and says "Is our frisbee now".
 In the NYPD Blue episode "Don We Now Our Gay Apparel" (aired January 3, 1995), Detective Greg Medavoy goes after a Romani family, who have scammed his elderly neighbor out of $3,000. The family operates a stereotypical fortune-teller business, fronted by a young Romani woman. When Medavoy arrests her, and her two brothers, the Romani woman says something in a foreign language and spits on him. One of the brothers informs Medavoy that she has cursed him. When Medavoy later develops a rash (which one of his co-worker says is likely just brought on by one of his numerous allergies), he starts worrying that the curse might be real.
 In the television film Young Indiana Jones: Travels with Father (aired 16 June 1996), a 10-year-old Indiana Jones visits Russia in 1909, with his family, and runs away with Leo Tolstoy. On their journey, the duo hitches a ride with a traveling Romani tribe, and spend the night in their camp. During the night, Imperial Cossack troops (that the government uses to rid themselves of undesirable ethnic groups) attacks the camp, setting fire to the tents and killing many of the Romani people there. Indiana and Tolstoy barely make it away alive. They seek refuge at a church, only to almost be cast out by two antiziganistic priests, who mistake them for Romani.
 1997 Greek television series Whispers of the Heart (Greek: Ψίθυροι Καρδιάς) was about a rich architect who falls in love with a young beautiful gypsy girl. It aired in 1997 and it is one of the most popular, Greek television series.
 In Buffy the Vampire Slayer (1997-2003), Romanies in 19th Century Romania place a curse on the vampire Angelus to punish him for the murder of a teenage Romani girl (said to have been as "dumb as a post"), by restoring his human soul (and by extension, his conscience) and forcing him to feel guilt for his crimes. Angel was doomed to misery until he could enjoy a moment of pure happiness. It is later revealed that these Romanies were members of the Kalderash tribe and that the character Jenny Calendar, actually Janna of the Kalderash, is a member of the tribe, who was sent to ensure the continued suffering of Angel. Under orders from her tribe, Jenny sets out to break up Angel and Buffy Summers, manipulating Angel into leaving Sunnydale. After Jenny's deception, and true identity, is exposed, the Scoobies turn against her. Jenny is soon after brutally murdered by Angelus. In an analysis of the treatment of Romani people in literature and media, Nikolina Dobreva asserts that the show deserves to be criticized for associating Romani with curses and primitivism, for stereotyping the Romani people as "irrevocably foreign" in clothing and speech, and for perpetuating the persistent air of mystery surrounding them. Dobreva, however, praises the character of Jenny Calendar, writing in 2009: "Jenny's character, despite the reversion to a few stereotypes, is arguably one of the most multi-faceted and positive representations of a female Gypsy in the past 20 years. In sharp contrast to all other Gypsy portrayals, she is technologically savvy, and, instead of resorting to incantations or obscure rituals, is able to create a computer algorithm that would make possible the restoration of Angel's soul."
 In the episode "The Girl in Question" (aired 5 May 2004), of the spin-off Angel (1999-2004), the character of Ilona Costa Bianchi (Carole Raphaelle Davis) comments on the Romani people. She says that "The Gypsies are filthy people", who uses spells. Angel makes no objections to Ilona's comments. Whenever she mentions the Romani people, Ilona spits out of disgust.
 Futurama (1999-2013) features a recurring character called "Gypsy-Bot" (voiced by Tress MacNeille), a fortune-telling robot, whose design is based on the stereotypical image of a Romani fortune-teller (and is shown living in a stereotypical caravan). In the episode "Godfellas", the character is hinted at not really being psychic (and is shown trying to con money from Fry), when she responds to a question with "What am I, psychic?". In the episode "The Tip of the Zoidberg" (aired 18 August 2011), the incompetent Doctor Zoidberg subjects the employees of Planet Express to (among other things) "Gypsy curses".
 The Chilean telenovela Romané (2000) features the life of the Romani in the north of Chile.
 In The Twilight Zone "Cradle of Darkness" (aired 2 October 2002), a woman named Andrea Collins (Katherine Heigl) travels back to 1889, with the intent of assassinating the infant Adolf Hitler (thus preventing World War II). Andrea drows herself and the infant Adolf. However, a housemaid working for the Hitler family, sees Andrea's actions, and decides not to inform the family. The housemaid encounters a homeless Romani mother. She buys the Romani woman's infant son, whom housemaid passes off to the Hitler family as baby Adolf Hitler. The episode's closing narration establishes this baby as historic Adolf Hitler, the very monster that Andrea had attempted to destroy.
 The television series WB television series Charmed episode "The Eyes Have It" (aired 20 October 2002), depicted Romanies, referred to as "gypsies", as practicing a magical craft similar to those of modern-day witches. Much like the star witches in the series, Romanies possess supernatural powers and pass down family Books of Shadows.
 In the HBO series Carnivàle (2003-2005), the characters of Sophie and her mother Apollonia are said to be Roma.
 Stargate Atlantis (2004-2009), part of the Stargate science-fiction franchise, features a recurring race of humans named "Travelers". The Travelers are depicted as a nomadic people, who have lived in space for generations, and travels between planets in their own fleet of spaceships (they are one of the few human races in the franchise to possess their own spaceships).
 In the House episode "Needle in a Haystack" (aired 6 February 2007), Dr. House and his team must treat a 16-year-old Romani boy with respiratory distress. The boy's parents (who are established as having made their son drop out of school, and work for them) are played up as being anti-science and hostile towards outsiders (to the extent that they can't touch people who aren't Romani). The Doctors have to lie and distract the parents, in order to be able to examine and treat the boy. Dr. Foreman is critical of the parents, whom he feels are wasting their son's potential, and offers to help him get a job at the hospital. The boy rejects the offer, because none of the Doctors treating him are married (convincing the boy that the same would happen to him, unless he goes home with his family).
 Ashes to Ashes (2008-2010) main cast includes WPC/DC Sharon "Shaz" Granger (Montserrat Lombard), who is part Romani. The show centers around Detective Inspector Alex Drake, a woman from 2008, who is shot by a criminal and wakes up in 1981. The show's ending reveals that all of the main characters are cops, who suffered traumatic deaths, and are now in Limbo (where their souls have a chance to lay their inner demons to rest). In the case of Shaz: she had been a WPC in 1995, who had attempted to apprehend a car thief, and gotten stabbed. Her Romani heritage was revealed in the second episode of Series 2 (aired 27 April 2009). The plot has Alex trying to clear her name when she is involved in the accidental death of an English Romanichal. She uncovers a premeditated plot to murder him. The episode does include some stereotypical elements as the plot unfolds; namely the plot device of an old Romani clairvoyant and friction between the police and the Romani camp. However these stereotypes are turned on their head as the local doctor who was obsessed with the victim's wife is found guilty of poisoning and elements of police corruption. When Shaz hears one of her co-workers make antiziganistic remarks, she confronts him and reveals to him (and the rest of their co-workers) that her mother was Romani. The episode ends with Shaz being proposed to by her boyfriend, Chris Skelton, whose feelings for her has been left unchanged by the revelation of her ethnic background. In the show's finale, Shaz (along with the others) is able to leave Limbo and move on to eternal happiness.
 Lark Rise to Candleford, Series 2 Episode 1 (aired 21 December 2008) – A BBC costume drama. The village is haunted by the spirit of a young English Romany girl who drowned in the local lake.
 In the television show Criminal Minds, the fourth-season episode "Bloodlines" (aired 21 January 2009) depicts a family of Romani who kidnap little girls to marry their sons. During the abductions, the family also murders the parents of the girls. Penelope Garcia discovers that they've been doing this since, at least, 1909. In addition to kidnapping little girls, the Romani family is depicted as being highly superstitious, nomadic (living out of an RV), and as being thieves (with David Rossi stating that a lot of Romani people make their living as petty thieves). The Romani family are apprehended by the FBI, but the episode ends with another Romani family (the father of which is implied as being one of the first family's sons) getting ready to commit the same acts as them.
 In the Family Guy episode "Not All Dogs Go To Heaven" (aired 29 March 2009), a cutaway gag references Stephen King's Thinner. In the cutaway, Britney Spears is cursed by a Romani man, who touches her cheek and says "Thicker".
 In the Law & Order: Special Victims Unit episode "Lost Traveller" (season 13, episode 9. Aired 30 November 2011), the detectives investigate a missing Romani boy.
 The character Willa Monday on the TV show The Finder (2012) is a Romani juvenile delinquent.
 In the Once Upon a Time episode "The Doctor" (aired 28 October 2012), there is a young Romani witch-in-training, named Trish (played by Paula Giroday), who wears clothes similar to Esmeralda in the 1996 Disney animated film. In a flashback, Rumpelstiltskin is attempting to teach Regina magic. He tries to make her crush the heart of a unicorn, thus killing it. However, Regina cannot do it, and leaves Rumpelstiltskin. She later returns, and learns that he has taken on a new apprentice: Trish, a Romani woman. Without hesitation, Regina takes Trish's heart and crushes it, killing her instantly.
 In the Agatha Christie's Poirot episode "Dead Man's Folly" (aired 30 October 2013; an adaptation of the novel of the same name), the character of Sally Legge dresses up, and plays a Romani fortune teller (called "Madame Zuleika") for a summer fête. She pretend reads Poirot's future over a crystal ball, but quickly drops the theatrics, due to a mix of Poirot's questions (regarding the murder hunt, where Sally was originally going to play the murder victim, until others insisted that she'd tell fortunes instead) and Sally's own disinterest in doing this activity. 
In the How I Met Your Mother episode "Coming Back" (aired 23 September 2013), Barney Stinson reveals why he is constantly horny: the Stinson Curse. In 1807, in Moscow, his ancestors ran over an old Romani woman. The Romani woman pointed at them and said: "hornier". Cursing the male members of their family to constantly be horny (and unable to find satisfaction in committed relationships). After she's cursed them, the old Romani woman is shown magically transforming into a seductive young Romani woman, whom Barney's ancestor is unable to resist.
 The television series Hemlock Grove (2013–2015) features a family of Romani.
 The BBC television series Peaky Blinders (2013–2022) revolves around protagonist Tommy Shelby and the Shelby crime family who are of Romani heritage. It also features the Romani Lee family which includes main character Esme Lee, who marries one of the Shelby brothers.
 The television series Legion (2017–2019) centers around protagonist and mutant David Haller (based on the Marvel Comics character), whom the show depicts as being half-Romani. David is the son of mutant Charles Xavier and his wife, Gabrielle (Stephanie Corneliussen), a Romani Holocaust survivor. Charles and Gabrielle met in a mental hospital, after World War II, where they were both patients. Gabrielle had been rescued from the camps, but had lost her entire family and the trauma of the Holocaust had left Gabrielle catatonic. With his telepathy, Charles managed to get her out of that state. The two became close (helping each other get better), fell in love, and left the hospital together. Afterwards, they got married and had their son David. Gabrielle is depicted as a loving wife and mother (and a regular 1940s housewife), who struggles with the trauma of the Holocaust, when Charles leaves her alone for a while, to seek out the mutant Amahl Farouk. In the comics, Gabrielle was a Jewish Holocaust survivor.
 On the television Series What We Do in the Shadows (2019–present) the character of Nadja is a Romani Vampire.
 In the Father Brown episode "The Numbers of the Beast" (aired 13 January 2020), Mrs. McCarthy and her sister, Roisin, visit a Romani fortune teller named Trafalgar Devlin, who lives in a caravan. Devlin reads their tea leaves, and supplies them with what turns out to be the winning numbers in a charity bingo game. When it gets out that the winning numbers came from Devlin, many of the locals come to him for winning numbers and betting results. Father Brown and Penelope "Bunty" Windermere drops by his caravan for tea. While there, Father Brown drops his spoon on the floor, picks it up, and puts it back on the saucer of his teacup. Noting no reaction from Devlin, Father Brown realizes that Devlin is not actually Romani, but a con artist, as no true Romani man would permit such an unclean act. The cause for the winning bingo numbers are explained away, as another person having rigged the numbers.
 The television series 1883 (2021–2022) centers on a wagon train led by Shea Brennan (Sam Elliott), in the 1880s. Most of the people taking part in the wagon train are European immigrants, who have come to start a new life in Oregon. Among the immigrants is Noemi (Gratiela Brancusi), a young Romani woman, who has come to America with her husband and their two sons. When bandits attack the wagon train's camp, Noemi's husband is among the people killed, leaving her a widow. Out of desperation (scared and fearful of her, and her sons, future), Noemi offers herself up as a wife to the widowed Brennan, but he turns her down. Together with Thomas (LaMonica Garrett), Brennan does set out to help Noemi, seeing her struggling without her husband and facing antiziganism from some of the other immigrants. Over the course of the journey, Noemi becomes more self-sufficient, teaching herself how to hunt and use a rifle. She also becomes close to and romantically involved with Thomas, despite some initial reservations from Thomas (due to him being a black man, thus unable to marry Noemi). After two of the other immigrants, Josef and his wife, are injured and unable to drive their wagon, Noemi offers and drives their wagon for them. Together with Josef (whose wife dies), Noemi and her sons, are the only ones of the immigrants to make it to Oregon. Noemi, her sons, and Thomas settles in the Willamette Valley.
 No Mundo da Luna (2022–present) is a television series centered around a young Romani woman named Luna Lovari (played by Marina Moschen), who is an aspiring journalist. Luna attempts to get a reporter job at a newspaper. However, the editor (who has found out that Luna is Romani) only offers Luna a position writing horoscopes for the magazine (as she assumes that all Romani women are fortune tellers, and is surprised to see that Luna is not wearing a stereotypical skirt). A reluctant Luna takes the job, despite not knowing the first thing about tarot cards. She goes to her grandmother, who does. The grandmother becomes upset and says that the non-Romani think that all Romani people are the same. She also tells Luna that she won't let her use their culture without knowing anything about it, while it would take her years of study to use the cards. Without her grandmother's permission, Luna takes some tarot cards that have been in the family's possession for centuries. Fleeing from her grandmother's house, Luna is followed to her car by her brother and grandmother. The grandmother says something in the Romani language (Luna, who never learned it, doesn't understand), which prompts Luna to declare that her grandmother is putting a curse on her (likely sarcastically, as Luna's shown to not believe in psychic powers) and drives off. Luna's brother remarks that Luna missed the class about "Gypsy curses" not existing. When Luna later starts using the cards, the artwork becomes animated and the figures seemingly speak to her, as if through magic. In one episode, an entertainment company sees a video from the wedding of Luna's cousin, whose wedding dress caught fire. This inspires them to plan a movie called "The Curse of the Gypsy Bride" (intended to use all clichés about Romani people), much to the annoyance of Luna. A reluctant Luna takes part in a press event for the movie, together with the two (non-Roma) actors cast to play the leads. The lead actress expresses a fear of Romani people, and asks if they still live in tents (and travels around Europe). Eventually, Luna has had enough and tells everyone off for reducing the rich Roma culture to stereotypes. The planned film is shot down, after a video of the event leaks online, and results in the entertainment company being bombarded with allegations of racism and cultural appropriation (with the internet not being too happy about them not even casting real Romani actors for the two leads).

Film
Romani characters are frequently depicted in werewolf films, including Maleva the fortuneteller (Maria Ouspenskaya) in The Wolf Man and the Romani clan of female werewolves in Cry of the Werewolf.

See also
Gypsy (term)
Antiziganism

Explanatory notes

References